Ismene, or Peruvian daffodil, is a genus of South American plants in the Amaryllis family. The species are native to Peru and Ecuador and widely cultivated elsewhere as ornamentals because of their large, showy flowers.

Ismene produces tender perennial bulbs bearing a strong resemblance to those of Hymenocallis, a genus into which Ismene had often been grouped in the past. However, its morphology differs from Hymenocallis in several significant ways: its vegetative parts, natural range, and chromosome number are all distinct.

Ismene can be difficult to grow in the United States.

Species
A list of Ismene species and their geographic distribution is given below.
Ismene amancaes (Ruiz & Pav.) Herb – western Peru
Ismene hawkesii (Vargas) Gereau & Meerow – Cusco, Peru
Ismene longipetala (Lindl.) Meerow – southwestern Ecuador, northwestern Peru
Ismene morrisonii (Vargas) Gereau & Meerow –  Apurímac, Peru
Ismene narcissiflora (Jacq.) M.Roem. – south-central Peru
Ismene nutans (Ker Gawl.) Herb. – Peru
Ismene pedunculata Herb. – Peru
Ismene ringens (Ruiz & Pav.) Gereau & Meerow – Peru
Ismene sublimis (Herb.) Gereau & Meerow – La Libertad, Peru
Ismene vargasii (Velarde) Gereau & Meerow – Peru

Hybrids
 Ismene × deflexa Herb. (I. longipetala × I. narcissiflora) – Peru

References

External links
  International Bulb Society's gallery of photographs

Amaryllidoideae
Amaryllidaceae genera
Flora of South America